Elections to Daventry District Council were held on 4 May 2006. One third of the council was up for election and the Conservative Party stayed in overall control of the council.

After the election, the composition of the council was:
Conservative 34
Labour 2
Liberal Democrat 2

Election result

6 Conservative candidates were unopposed.

Ward results

References
2006 Daventry election result
Ward results
Conservatives hold on to Daventry

2006 English local elections
2006
2000s in Northamptonshire